The Burning Room is the 27th novel by American crime author Michael Connelly, and the seventeenth novel featuring Los Angeles Police Department detective Harry Bosch. The book was published by Little, Brown and Company on November 3, 2014.

Plot
Harry Bosch and his rookie partner Lucia Soto are assigned the case of Orlando Merced, a mariachi performer who was shot in a crowded Los Angeles square and was paralyzed from the waist down. The shooter was never found, and Merced survived for ten years before dying from complications from his wounds. When the bullet is finally removed from his body, Bosch establishes that Merced was shot with a hunting rifle, and that the crime was not a random act of gang violence as originally suspected, but a targeted hit. This new evidence leads Bosch to one of the city's most powerful businessmen and a controversial former mayor with aspirations of becoming governor.

Meanwhile, Bosch notices strange behavior from Soto and begins to suspect that she has gang affiliations and has infiltrated the LAPD. After catching her carrying out an off-the-books investigation, she reveals that she is a survivor of a notorious apartment fire that killed nine children, but remained unsolved after a key suspect disappeared without trace. Bosch fabricates a connection to the Merced case to protect Soto, and the two investigate the fire parallel to the Merced case. The trail leads them to a series of robberies across Greater Los Angeles that the FBI believe were used to fund a white supremacist militia group, and ultimately to a witness hiding in a convent on the Mexican border.

Over the course of the story, Bosch wrestles with the knowledge that his retirement is imminent and makes it his mission to train Soto to take over in the Open-Unsolved Unit. Ultimately, he is caught breaking into the Robbery Homicide Division offices as part of the Merced investigation and is placed on indefinite suspension pending an investigation. With less than a year until his retirement, he leaves Open-Unsolved knowing that he may never return.

2014 American novels
Harry Bosch series
Novels set in Los Angeles
American detective novels
Little, Brown and Company books